Giulio Litta, Viscount Arese, (1822 – 29 May 1891) was an Italian composer. He was trained at the Milan Conservatory where his first opera, Bianca di Santafiora, premiered in 1843. He composed several more operas, most of which premiered at theatres in Milan. His last opera, Il violino di Cremona, was heard at La Scala in 1882.

References

External links
 

1822 births
1891 deaths
Italian classical composers
Italian male classical composers
Italian opera composers
Male opera composers
19th-century classical composers
19th-century Italian composers
19th-century Italian male musicians